The Hawkeye College Conference was a short-lived intercollegiate athletic conference that existed from 1914 to 1917. The league had members in the state of Iowa. Some of its members subsequently formed the Iowa Intercollegiate Athletic Association, later known as the Iowa Intercollegiate Athletic Conference and now the American Rivers Conference, in 1922.

Football champions

1914 – Unknown
1915 – Unknown
1916 – Loras and Dubuque
1917 – Dubuque

See also
List of defunct college football conferences
American Rivers Conference

References

Defunct college sports conferences in the United States
College sports in Iowa